According to its website, Zambeef is the largest beef producer in Zambia. The company also provides feedlot services, and manufactures milk, chicken, eggs, leather and shoes. The company operates a fast food restaurant chain and a trucking company, including a fleet of refrigerated trucks. Zambeef grows crops, including wheat, maize, lucerne and soybeans, produces feed, and operates feed processing plants. Its subsidiaries include Master Meats Production Company, of Nigeria. The company's export business is active, especially throughout southern Africa.

Zambeef also has a concessionary agreement with Shoprite to run all their butcheries.

Zambeef'' claims to have a good Corporate social responsibility programme, since 2007 it has supported the African football social enterprise Alive & Kicking, giving it space on its Zamleather site as well as start up contributions.Zambeef is listed on the Lusaka Stock Exchange with a market capitalisation of over US$70 million.

In July 2022, Zambeef signed a ZMW 570.0 million (US$35.0 million) debt facility with the International Finance Corporation (“IFC”) to partially fund its Mpongwe Farm expansion of US$ 100.0 million that the company announced in June 2022.

OperationsDataZambeef:
Slaughters 60,000 cattle per year
Produces 8 million liters of milk per year
Processes 3.5 million chickens per year
Produces 20 million eggs per year
Produces 120 million tons of feed per
Processes 90,000 hides per year
Operates over 80 retail butcheries
Operates the in-store meat departments of the Shoprite supermarket chainBrands'''
Zambeef brands include:
Novatek
Zambeef
Zamchick
Zamchick Egg
Zamchick Inns
Zamflour
Zam Milk
Zamsip
Zamleather Limited
Zamshu

References

External links
Zambeef Products plc
Diagram of corporate operations
Investor center
ZAMBEEF: 2008 annual report
ZAMBEEF: 2009 annual report
ZAMBEEF: Yielding the Fruit of Diversification
Zambeef at Alacrastore

Agriculture companies of Zambia
Food and drink companies of Zambia
Companies based in Lusaka
Brand name poultry meats
Shoe companies
Companies with year of establishment missing
Companies listed on Lusaka Stock Exchange